Eduardo Mallea (14 August 1903 in Bahía Blanca – 12 November 1982 in Buenos Aires) was an Argentine essayist, cultural critic, writer and diplomat. In 1931 he became editor of the literary magazine  of La Nación.

Works

 Cuentos para una inglesa desesperada (1926, ed. Gleizer)
 Conocimiento y expresión de la Argentina (1935, Essay, Buenos Aires, Sur)
 Nocturno Europeo (1935, Novel, Buenos Aires Sur)
 La Ciudad junto al rio inmóvil (1936, Nine Short Novels, Buenos Aires, Sur)
 Historia de una pasión Argentina (1937, essay, Buenos Aires, Sur)
 Fiesta en Noviembre (1938, Buenos Aires, Club del Libro A.L.A.)
 Meditación en la costa (1939, Buenos Aires, Imprenta Mercatali)
 La Bahía del Silencio (1940, Buenos Aires, Sudamericana)
 El sayal y la púrpura (1941, essay, Buenos Aires, Losada)
 Todo verdor perecerá (1943, novel, Buenos Aires, Espasa-Calpe)
 Las Águilas (1944, novel, Buenos Aires, Sudamericana)
 Rodeada esta de sueño (1946, Buenos Aires, Espasa-Calpe)
 El retorno (1946, Buenos Aires, Espasa-Calpe)
 El vínculo. Los Rembrandts. La rosa de Cernobbio. (1946, Noveulles, Emecé)
 Los enemigos del alma (1950, novel, Buenos Aires, Sudamericana)
 La Torre (1951, novel, Buenos Aires, Sudamericana)
 Chaves (1953, novel, Buenos Aires, Emecé)
 La sala de espera (1953, Buenos Aires, Sudamericana)
 Notas de un novelista (1954, essays, Buenos Aires, Losada)
 Simbad (1957, novel, Sudamericana)
 El gajo de enebro (1957, Buenos Aires, Emecé)
 Posesión (1958, nouvelles, Buenos Aires, Sudamericana)
 La razón humana (1959, nouvelles, Buenos Aires, Losada)
 La vida Blanca (1960, Buenos Aires, Sur)
 Las Travesías I (1961, Buenos Aires, Sudamericana)
 Las Travesías II (1962, Buenos Aires, Sudamericana)
 La representación de los aficionados (1962, Buenos Aires, Sudamericana)
 La guerra interior (1963, essay, Buenos Aires, Sudamericana)
 Poderío de la novela (1965, essay, Buenos Aires, Aguilar)
 El resentimiento (1966, noveulles, Buenos Aires, Sudamericana)
 La barca de hielo (1967, short stories, Buenos Aires, Sudamericana)
 La red (1968, short stories, Buenos Aires, Sudamericana)
 La penúltima puerta (1969, Buenos Aires, Sudamericana)
 Triste piel del universo (1971, novel, Buenos Aires, Sudamericana)
 Gabriel Andaral (1971, Buenos Aires, Sudamericana)
 En la creciente oscuridad (1973, Buenos Aires, Sudamericana)
 Los papeles privados (1974, essay, Buenos Aires, Sudamericana)
 La mancha en el mármol (1982, short stories, Buenos Aires, Sudamericana)
 La noche enseña a la noche (1985, novel, Buenos Aires, Sudamericana)

See also
Literature of Argentina

References
Roberto Yahni & Pedro Orgambide, Ed.: Enciclopedia de la literatura Argentina. Buenos Aires, Ed. Sudamericana, 1970
Fundación Eduardo Mallea. Buenos Aires, 2006

External links 
Fundación Eduardo Mallea

Argentine male novelists
Argentine diplomats
People from Bahía Blanca
Burials at La Recoleta Cemetery
1903 births
1982 deaths
20th-century Argentine novelists
20th-century Argentine male writers